Emerald Bay State Park is a state park of California in the United States, centered on Lake Tahoe's Emerald Bay, a National Natural Landmark. Park features include Eagle Falls and Vikingsholm, a 38-room mansion that is considered one of the finest examples of Scandinavian architecture in the United States. The architect was Leonard Palme, who was hired by his aunt Laura Knight to design and build Vikingsholm. The park contains the only island in Lake Tahoe, Fannette Island. The park is accessible by California State Route 89 near the southwest shore of the lake. Emerald Bay is one of Lake Tahoe's most photographed and popular locations.

In 1969 Emerald Bay was recognized as a National Natural Landmark by the federal Department of the Interior. In 1994 California State Parks included the surrounding water of the bay as a part of the park, making Emerald Bay one of the first underwater parks of its type in the state, protecting the various wrecks and other items on the bay's bottom.

The  park was established in 1953. It is located directly south of D. L. Bliss State Park.

During harsh winters the bay freezes over.

Gallery

References

External links
 
 Emerald Bay State Park

1953 establishments in California
History of El Dorado County, California
Lake Tahoe
National Natural Landmarks in California
Parks in El Dorado County, California
Protected areas established in 1953
Protected areas of the Sierra Nevada (United States)
State parks of California